On August 3, 1990, President of the United States George H. W. Bush declared the month of November as National American Indian Heritage Month, thereafter commonly referred to as Native American Heritage Month. The bill read in part that "the President has authorised and requested to call upon Federal, State and local Governments, groups and organisations and the people of the United States to observe such month with appropriate programs, ceremonies and activities".  This landmark bill honouring America's tribal people represented a major step in the establishment of this celebration which began in 1976 when a Cherokee/Osage Indian named Jerry C. Elliott-High Eagle authored Native American Awareness Week legislation the first historical week of recognition in the nation for native peoples. This led to 1986 with then President Ronald Reagan proclaiming November 23–30, 1986, as "American Indian Week".

This commemorative month aims to provide a platform for Native people in the United States of America to share their culture, traditions, music, crafts, dance, and ways and concepts of life.  This gives Native people the opportunity to express to their community, both city, county and state officials their concerns and solutions for building bridges of understanding and friendship in their local area. Federal Agencies are encouraged to provide educational programs for their employees regarding Native American history, rights, culture and contemporary issues, to better assist them in their jobs and for overall awareness.

History of public observances for American Indians

Current designation

 101st United States Congress –  November 1990 National American Indian Heritage Month

Previous designations

 101st Congress –  December 3–9, 1989 (American Indian Week)
 100th United States Congress – , September 23–30, 1988 (American Indian Week)
 100th Congress – , November 22–28, 1987 (American Indian Week)
 99th United States Congress – , November 23–30, 1986 (American Indian Week)
 97th United States Congress – , May 13, 1983 (American Indian Day)

Proclamations
In 1976, a Cherokee Indian named J.C. Elliott-High Eagle authored the historic first week of awareness and recognition for native American Indian and Alaska natives. The week of ceremonies and activities were held in October. 
In 2012, 2013, 2014, 2015 and 2016 President Barack Obama made a Presidential proclamation on the 31st of October of each year that each respective November would be National Native American Heritage Month.

In 2017 and 2018 and 2019 President Donald Trump made a Presidential proclamation on the 31st of October of each year that each respective November would be National Native American Heritage Month.

Legislation
A Cherokee American Indian, J.C. Elliott-High Eagle, authored  (S.J. Res. 209) for American Indian Awareness Week, October 10–16, 1976, signed by President Gerald R. Ford. This became the first official week of national recognition for the American Indian (Proclamation 4468) since the founding of the nation.

Controversy 
On October 31, 2019, President Donald Trump also proclaimed November 2019 as National American History and Founders Month to celebrate the first European founders and colonizers of America. In a similar fashion to when, on October 13, 2019, President Donald Trump issued a formal proclamation recognizing Columbus Day and not Indigenous Peoples' Day, some journalists suggested National American History and Founders Month is an attempt to subvert attention from National Native American Heritage Month and stifle the indigenous voice by announcing a celebration that can be viewed as opposing and contradictory to what National Native American Heritage Month is supposed to highlight and honor.

See also 
 Indigenous Peoples' Day
 Native American Day
 Native American Heritage Day

References

External links

Presidential Proclamation -- National Native American Heritage Month, 2011
Native American Heritage Month: Fact Sheet Congressional Research Service

Presidential Proclamation - National Native American Heritage Month 2013

Month-long observances
Native American culture
Observances in the United States
November observances
Commemorative months